Burgess House may refer to:

Burgess House (Colorado Springs, Colorado), listed on the National Register of Historic Places in El Paso County, Colorado
Joseph Fields Burgess House, Sadieville, Kentucky, listed on the National Register of Historic Places in Scott County, Kentucky
Walter and Eva Burgess Farm, Macomber Corner, Maine, listed on the National Register of Historic Places in Piscataquis County, Maine
Burgess House (Sebec, Maine), listed on the National Register of Historic Places in Piscataquis County, Maine
Thornton W. Burgess House, Hampden, Massachusetts, listed on the NRHP in Massachusetts 
Charles H. Burgess House, Quincy, Massachusetts, listed on the NRHP in Massachusetts
Frank Burgess House, Quincy, Massachusetts, listed on the NRHP in Massachusetts
Sarchet-Burgess House, Cambridge, Ohio, listed on the National Register of Historic Places in Guernsey County, Ohio